Hickinbotham Oval (currently known as Flinders University Stadium due to naming rights, and originally Noarlunga Oval) is an Australian rules football stadium in Noarlunga Downs, an outer-southern suburb of Adelaide. It has been the home of South Australian National Football League (SANFL) club South Adelaide Football Club (also known as "The Panthers") since 1995. In 2018 the ground was re-named Flinders University Stadium, as part of a five-year sponsorship deal with Flinders University.

After 111 years (in two stints, 1882-1903 and 1904-1994) of playing their home games at the Adelaide Oval, (which is located on the northern side of the Adelaide city centre and the Torrens River), the club decided to move to the southern suburb of Noarlunga in the early 1990s. The club had played two games at the Bice Oval in Christies Beach (approximately 1.5km from Hickinbotham) in 1992 and 1993 in order to gauge support in the area for the club. Approximately 8,000 fans occupied the Oval in 1993 to see the Panthers' match against the Glenelg Tigers. That level of community support was one of the determining factors in South Adelaide's decision to permanently move to Noarlunga, becoming a community based club for the first time in its then 119-year history.

The Panthers clubrooms and administration offices, which had previously been located on South Road at St Marys (directly opposite the then Mitsubishi Motors factory at Tonsley Park), were also relocated to the Noarlunga Oval.

History

SANFL
The stadium has a capacity of 12,000 people, with seating for up to 1,000 in the Jim Deane Grandstand, named in honor of South Adelaide's 1953 and 1957 Magarey Medallist. The record crowd for Noarlunga is 10,123 attending the SANFL match between South Adelaide and Glenelg on 6 May 1995 – the first SANFL match played at the venue.

The stadium is located at the top of a hill, and is known for its cold southerly wind and wet weather coming straight from the nearby Gulf St Vincent, something which is generally unpopular with spectators as only the grandstand and a roofed standing-room-only area in front of the change rooms offer any protection from the weather.

Flinders University Stadium's dimensions are 170×135 m, giving it the widest playing surface in the SANFL. To entertain fans, the South Adelaide Football Club has introduced a gas powered fireball that shoots up at the start of all four-quarters of Panthers night games. The fireball, located in the south east corner of the ground near the scoreboard, also ignites every time the Panthers league team kicks a goal.

The venue was renamed from Noarlunga Oval to Hickinbotham Oval in 2005 to honour former Panther captain-coach and successful property developer Alan Hickinbotham. In 2018 the strong partnership between South Adelaide and Flinders University reached the next level, with the club announcing that the ground would be re-named Flinders University Stadium, as part of a five-year deal with Flinders University.

Along with the Norwood and Richmond Ovals, Flinders University Stadium is one of only three SANFL grounds not used for cricket during the summer months. This generally means that the centre squares of these grounds (where the cricket pitches would be located) are not as susceptible to becoming a mud patch after rain during the football season, and these ovals are generally regarded as having the better surfaces in the SANFL.

In late 2010 the South Adelaide Football Club obtained permission from the City of Onkaparinga to install four light towers at the oval, with the intent to host night SANFL games at the venue. Two mobile phone towers at the ground also carry lights, giving a total of 6 light towers. The oval is not located in the midst of suburban homes and streets (like most other suburban SANFL grounds), and is surrounded by plenty of free car parking (available across Goldsmith Drive, behind the northern goals, in the Centro Colonnades car park, and the members' car park is located behind the grandstand). This made gaining permission to install the lights easier as the impact on local residents from the lights and parking was minimal.

The oval is the only SANFL venue where spectators can park their cars around the ground itself on the northern and eastern sides of the ground, giving it a country feel with people often watching games from inside their car or on top of the bonnet – large nets are in place behind the northern goals to protect cars from footballs kicked there. Other than the Jim Deane Grandstand, the main spectator areas are the north western grassed bank, while the grassed area behind the southern goals is a non-smoking and alcohol-free family area.

The first official SANFL night game was played at the oval on 21 April 2011, with the Panthers defeating Port Adelaide in front of the ground's night attendance record crowd of 2,700. However, the lights failed at the start of a Souths v Adelaide Crows game in 2015 and the organisers had to reorganise the match schedule for the 2015 season.

Southern Football League (SFL)
As Flinders University Stadium has the largest spectator capacity, and has the most modern facilities, of any outdoor sports venue in the southern suburbs , it has been used as the Grand Final venue for the Southern Football League since 2005.

Jimmy Deane's Entertainment Venue
Opened in 1995, Flinders University Stadium is the newest suburban ground used by the SANFL by some 30 years. It is generally regarded as having some of the better player and officials facilities in the league. The oval has also been extensively redeveloped in recent years with the Panthers opening including entertainment and dining establishments such as  Jimmy Deane's.

Access
Flinders University Stadium is easily accessed by both road and public transport. The oval is located approximately 600 metres south of Noarlunga Centre railway station which is serviced by both bus and rail, with the rail line having been upgraded in 2013, and an extension beyond Noarlunga Centre to Seaford which opened in February 2014.

Unfortunately, attendances at the oval for SANFL games still suffer because of its location: Flinders University Stadium is located approximately  km south of Adelaide, with most clubs located closer to the city, and the nearest club is Glenelg (15 km). As such, non-Panthers supporters have shown a reluctance for travelling the distance to the venue by road or public transport, especially as football is played in the winter and Noarlunga’s reputation for being cold.

Another issue is the club's small fan base, which is further exacerbated by the Panthers' poor results in recent history. South Adelaide has not won the SANFL premiership since 1964 - the longest current premiership drought in the league and elite Australian Rules football - and has not played in the Grand Final since 1979.

The Central District Bulldogs home ground, Elizabeth Oval, is located as far north of Adelaide as the Panthers are south.

References and notes

External links

 

Sports venues in Adelaide
Australian rules football grounds